The Hot Springs Confederate Monument is located in Landmark Plaza in central Hot Springs, Arkansas. It is a marble representation of a Confederate Army soldier, manufactured by the McNeel Marble Company of Marietta, Georgia. The monument was placed in 1934 by the local chapter of the United Daughters of the Confederacy, and was the last Confederate monument placed in one of Arkansas' major cities. Lynchings took place at the site in the decades before its construction.

The monument was listed on the National Register of Historic Places in 1996.

See also

National Register of Historic Places listings in Garland County, Arkansas

References

Buildings and structures completed in 1934
Buildings and structures in Hot Springs, Arkansas
Confederate States of America monuments and memorials in Arkansas
Monuments and memorials on the National Register of Historic Places in Arkansas
National Register of Historic Places in Hot Springs, Arkansas
Neoclassical architecture in Arkansas
1934 establishments in Arkansas